Ghoom is an Indian parody comedy film directed by Ashish Patil and produced by Runaway Productions on 2 June 2006. The film is a spoof of 2004 film Dhoom. The film stars Sumeet Raghavan, Ajay Gehi, Purbi Joshi and Gaurav Chopra.The film had a limited theatrical release in four cities on 2 June 2006 before its television premiere on 17 June 2006 on MTV India.

Synopsis
Cops, robbers, big bikes and even bigger women – that's what ‘Ghoom’ is all about. The movie puts the whole cops-and-robbers genre on the frying pan and serves it funny side up! The film is about a super cop, who wants to nab a gang of five biker thieves posing as pizza delivery guys.  Fed up of these thieves on fast machines always escaping him, the super cop enlists the help of a speedy mechanic to help foil their next robbery.  The mechanic, however, who turns out to be a bigger idiot than the cop and the mega robbery that's supposed to happen at a well-known dance bar becomes a riot of idiotic incidents.

Cast
Sumeet Raghavan as Inspector Vijay Dikshit 
Gaurav Chopra as Balbir
Ajay Gehi as Neal
 Benika Bisht as Tweety Dikshit
Purbi Joshi as Sun tanned, moon shined girl 
Feroz as Amitabh Bachchan

References

External links
Ghoom Bollywood hungama

2000s Hindi-language films
2006 films
2000s parody films
Indian parody films
Cultural depictions of Amitabh Bachchan
2006 comedy films